"In the Ghetto" (originally titled "The Vicious Circle") is a 1969 song recorded by Elvis Presley and written by Mac Davis. It was a major hit released in 1969 as a part of Presley's comeback album, and also on the single release of "Any Day Now" as the flip side.

Background 
The lyrics to the song were written by country music songwriter and singer Mac Davis. The version recorded by Presley is played in the key of B flat. "In the Ghetto" was recorded during Presley's session in the American Sound Studio in Memphis, Tennessee. It was Presley's first creative recording session since the Elvis '68 Comeback Special. Other hits recorded at this session were "Suspicious Minds", "Kentucky Rain", and "Don't Cry Daddy".

The song was published by Gladys Music, Inc., Elvis Presley's publishing company.

The song was Presley's first Top 10 hit in the United States in four years, peaking at number 3, and number 2 in Canada.  It was his first UK Top 10 hit in three years, also peaking at No. 2. It hit No. 1 on Cashbox and No. 8 Easy Listening. It was a number-one hit in West Germany, Ireland, Norway, Australia and New Zealand.

As a major international hit, Presley included it in his setlist during his return to live performances at the International Hotel in Las Vegas in 1969. It was a staple of his shows in the first two seasons; however, in his third (August/September 1970), he included it only once, at the dinner show on August 13, for the benefit of the Metro-Goldwyn-Mayer cameras filming the documentary Elvis: That's the Way It Is (1970). This version started without pause at the end of another hit from 1969, "Don't Cry Daddy".

Lyrics 

A boy is born to a mother who already has more children than she can feed in a Chicago ghetto. The boy grows up hungry, learns how to steal and fight, purchases a gun and steals a car, tries to run, but is killed. The song ends with another child being born the same day in the ghetto, implying that the newborn could meet the same fate, continuing the cycle of poverty and violence.

Charts

Certifications

Lisa Marie Presley duet version 
The song was recorded in 2007 by Lisa Marie Presley as a duet to raise money for the Presley Charitable Foundation. The song was released on iTunes.

Cover versions 
After Elvis Presley, the song has been performed by many other artists. Among them were Sammy Davis Jr., Marilyn Manson, Natalie Merchant, Tracy Chapman, Susan Cadogan, Wet Wet Wet, Candi Staton, Dolly Parton, Bobby Blue Bland, Bobbie Gentry, Nick Cave and the Bad Seeds, Ian Stuart Donaldson, Weeping Willows, The Cranberries, Merle Haggard, Hecchi & Kethmer, Leatherface, Three Six Mafia, DNX vs. The Voice, Bad Lieutenant, Fair Warning, Beats International, Eleanor Shanley, Jim Goad and Chris Clark. The Spanish singer and actor Enrique Castellon Vargas, also known as "El Principe Gitano" (The Gypsy Prince), recorded a version of the song, a version sung with such a thick Spanish accent that the English lyrics were almost uninintelligible. In 1990, The KLF used a sample of the Elvis recording in their ambient DJ album Chill Out, while a year later Norman Cook issued a dance version with his Beats International collective, which reached number 44 in the UK charts. In 1996, a 'Fugees-esque' hip-hop trio called Ghetto People had a top ten hit in the German charts with a version recorded with local singer Detlef Malinkewitz. As Malinkewitz was recording under the pseudonym L-Viz at the time, some broadcasters in the UK credited the record to El Vez by mistake. Mac Davis recorded a version of the song for a greatest hits album released in 1979. In 2011, Chris de Burgh covered the song on his album Footsteps 2.

Gospel recording artist Reverend James Cleveland not only recorded a gospel version of the song, but he won his first Grammy Award for Best Soul Gospel Performance 1975 with the Southern California Community Choir for his 1974 album release, In the Ghetto.

Dancehall singer Sister Nancy used some of the song's lyrics in the song "Coward of the Country", which appeared on her 1982 album One, Two.

Following the death of the song's writer Mac Davis, Reba McEntire and Darius Rucker recorded a duet version of the song to honor him. It was released on November 11, 2020, immediately following a live performance at the 54th Annual Country Music Association Awards.

Nick Cave and the Bad Seeds version 

"In the Ghetto" was covered by Nick Cave and the Bad Seeds and was their debut single. It was recorded at the Trident Studios in London and released as a 7" on June 18, 1984, with the B-side "The Moon Is in the Gutter". It reached 84 on the UK Singles Chart. While originally not present on any album, it was later included on the CD reissue of the band's first album, From Her to Eternity.

Charts

Parodies and cultural references 
In the South Park episode "Chickenpox", Eric Cartman sings the song on the way to Kenny's house, which is located in a bad part of the town.

Rich Banks recorded a parody called "In the Grotto" for The Adam Carolla Show.

Paul Shanklin recorded a parody called "In a Yugo" for Rush Limbaugh, in which an environmentally-conscious family buys a Yugo to save motor fuel, only to get killed by a truck after swerving to miss a duck. Later, Shanklin updated his parody for a new generation too young to remember the Yugo, replacing it with its perceived equivalent, "In a Hybrid".

El Vez recorded a version titled "En el Barrio" that mixed humor with details about Chicano struggles.

The Danish satire duo Strengedrejerne recorded a parody called "Nede I Netto" in 2000 about a boy, who gets lost from his mother in a supermarket and compensates for the lack of attention by stealing a shopping cart full of cod roe. The song follows the original storyline precisely but parodies the rich welfare state of Denmark, where only luxury problems exist.

The Danish radio program  also recorded a parody called "Ned i NATO", which makes fun of former Danish Prime Minister Anders Fogh Rasmussen's path to a leading post at NATO.

The BBC radio comedy program Radio Active broadcast a version titled Tim the gecko.

Dutch television celebrity and comedian Paul de Leeuw, as his alter ego Bob de Rooy, released a Dutch-language translated version in 1992. The first Dutch-language version of the song was recorded by Flemish crooner Will Tura, whose version uses the wrong definite article "de" preceding the word "ghetto".

In the Fox sitcom New Girl, Jessica Day performs the song as an Elvis impersonator at her roommate Nick's father's funeral.

References

External links 
 Elvis and Lisa Marie Presley: "In the Ghetto"  (music video) at Spinner.com
 

1960s ballads
1969 singles
1984 singles
1969 songs
Cashbox number-one singles
Charity singles
Elvis Presley songs
Irish Singles Chart number-one singles
Mac Davis songs
Nick Cave songs
UK Independent Singles Chart number-one singles
Number-one singles in Australia
Number-one singles in Germany
Number-one singles in New Zealand
Number-one singles in Norway
Protest songs
Song recordings produced by Chips Moman
Song recordings produced by Flood (producer)
Songs about Chicago
Songs about crime
Songs about poverty
Songs written by Mac Davis
RCA Victor singles
Mute Records singles
Pop ballads
Gospel songs